Mixtow is a hamlet in the Lanteglos-by-Fowey parish in south east Cornwall, England.

References

Hamlets in Cornwall